The Tuen Mun South extension is a proposed  extension of the MTR rapid transit network in Hong Kong. It extends the existing train service of Tuen Ma line to the tenatively named A16 station in Tuen Mun Area 16 and ultimately a new western terminus, Tuen Mun South, near Tuen Mun Ferry Pier. The extension will extend southwards from the current western terminus, Tuen Mun station. The journey time from Tuen Mun South to Tuen Mun is estimated to be approximately 4 minutes. The track is planned to run on a viaduct.

History
The Tuen Mun South extension was one of the railway expansion projects recommended by the Railway Development Strategy 2014 (RDS-2014), published by the Hong Kong government's Transport and Housing Bureau in September 2014. The stated rationale for the project was to improve rail access to the area south of Tuen Mun town centre, serving the sizeable population living near Tuen Mun Ferry Pier. The RDS-2014 envisaged that the scheme, comprising an elevated one-stop extension of the West Rail to southern Tuen Mun, would be implemented between 2019 and 2022, and would cost an estimated HK$5.5 billion in 2013 prices.

In February 2016, the Hong Kong government invited the MTR Corporation to submit a proposal for the project. 

In May 2020, the government invited the MTR to proceed with detailed planning and design. At that time, approximately 60,000 people lived within a 500-metre catchment of Tuen Mun South station, while about 49,000 residents lived within the same distance of A16 station. As the area around A16 station includes a lot of vacant land, the new station is intended to encourage housing development there. The existing Tuen Mun Swimming Pool and other community facilities currently occupying Tuen Mun Area 16 will need to be demolished and reprovisioned elsewhere. The government expects that construction may commence in 2023.

References

Regional rail in Hong Kong
Tuen Mun
Proposed railway stations in Hong Kong
MTR stations in the New Territories